The 1972 Missouri Southern Lions football team represented Missouri Southern State College during the 1972 NAIA Division II football season, and completed the 6th season of Lion football at the senior college level. The Lions played their home games in Joplin, Missouri. The 1972 team came off a 4–6 record from the prior season. The 1972 team was headed by coach Jim Frazier. The team finished the regular season with an undefeated 10–0 record and made the program's first appearance in the NAIA playoffs. They won their first NAIA Division II Football National Championship with a 21–14 win over Northwestern College.

Schedule

References

Missouri Southern
Missouri Southern Lions football seasons
NAIA Football National Champions
College football undefeated seasons
Missouri Southern Lions football